Alessio Ascalesi (22 October 1872 – 11 May 1952) was an Italian Cardinal of the Roman Catholic Church and Archbishop of Naples.

Biography
Ascalesi was born in Casalnuovo, near Naples. He joined the priesthood and entered the Seminary of Spoleto. He was ordained on 8 June 1895. He joined the Congregation of the Most Precious Blood. He worked as a priest in the diocese of Spoleto from 1895 until 1909, doing pastoral work.

Pope Pius X appointed him Bishop of Muro Lucano on 29 April 1909. Ascalesi was transferred to see of Sant'Agata dei Goti on 19 June 1911, and was promoted to the metropolitan see of Benevento in 1915.

He was created and proclaimed Cardinal-Priest of San Callisto by Pope Benedict XV in the consistory of 4 December 1916. He participated in the conclave of 1922 that elected Pope Pius XI. Pope Pius transferred him to the metropolitan see of Naples on 7 March 1924. As Archbishop, he declared the 1925 Amalfi earthquake an expression of God's wrath for short skirts in current women's fashion. He also participated in the conclave of 1939 that elected Pope Pius XII.

He died at Naples in 1952.

References

1872 births
1952 deaths
People from the Province of Naples
20th-century Italian cardinals
Archbishops of Benevento
Archbishops of Naples
20th-century Italian Roman Catholic archbishops